Louis Vivien, called Vivien de Saint-Martin, (17 May 1802 – 26 December 1896) was a 19th-century French geographer.

Bibliography 
Gustave Vapereau (dir.), Dictionnaire universel des contemporains, 5th edition, Paris, Hachette, 1880,  (p. 1826).
Supplément au Dictionnaire général de biographie et d'histoire, de mythologie, de géographie ancienne et moderne comparée, des antiquités et des institutions grecques, romaines, françaises et étrangères by Charles Dezobry and Théodore Bachelet, 12th edition, Paris, Delagrave, 1902,  (p. 3137).

Main works 
1841–1842:Histoire générale de la Révolution française, de l'Empire, de la Restauration, de la Monarchie de 1830, jusques et compris 1841 (4 tomes en 2 volumes), Paris, Pourrat frères.
1844: Histoire de Napoléon et de l'Empire (2 tomes), Paris, Pourrat frères.
1845–1846: Histoire des découvertes géographiques des nations européennes dans les diverses parties du monde (2 volumes), Paris, Arthus-Bertrand.
1847: Recherches sur les populations primitives et les plus anciennes traditions du Caucase, Paris, Arthus-Bertrand.
1850–1852: Études de géographie ancienne et d'ethnographie asiatique (2 volumes), Paris, Arthus-Bertrand.
1852: Description historique et géographique de l'Asie mineure (2 volumes), Paris, Arthus-Bertrand.
1858: Étude sur la géographie grecque et latine de l'Inde, Paris, Imprimerie impériale.
1860: Étude sur la géographie et les populations primitives du nord-ouest de l'Inde, d'après les hymnes védiques, Paris, Imprimerie impériale.
1863: Le Nord de l'Afrique dans l'antiquité grecque et romaine, étude historique et géographique, Paris, Imprimerie impériale.
1873: Histoire de la géographie et des découvertes géographiques depuis les temps les plus reculés jusqu'à nos jours, Paris, Hachette.
1876–1915: with Franz Schrader : Atlas universel de géographie construit d'après les sources originales et les documents les plus récents, Paris, Hachette.
1879–1900: with Louis Rousselet : Nouveau dictionnaire de géographie universelle (9 volumes), Paris, Hachette.

External links 
 
 
 Louis Vivien de Saint-Martin on data.bnf.fr
 .

1802 births
People from Calvados (department)
1896 deaths
French geographers
French cartographers
19th-century French historians
19th-century geographers
Members of the Société Asiatique
Members of the Prussian Academy of Sciences
Officiers of the Légion d'honneur
Travelers in Asia Minor